Leudelange is a commune and town in south-western Luxembourg. It is situated in the canton of Esch-sur-Alzette.

, the town of Leudelange, which lies in the centre of the commune, had a population of 2,100.

Leudelange was formed on 1 July 1856, when it was detached from the commune of Reckange-sur-Mess.  The law forming Leudelange was passed on the 3 March 1856.

Population

Notable residents 
Gilles Müller, professional tennis player

References

External links
 Eco Habitat Lux: Solar pannel installation, Leudelange

 
Communes in Esch-sur-Alzette (canton)
Towns in Luxembourg